Datuk Nizam Abu Bakar Titingan (born 7 November 1965) is a Malaysian politician who has served as the State Assistant Minister to the Chief Minister of Sabah in the Gabungan Rakyat Sabah (GRS) state administration under Chief Minister Hajiji Noor since October 2022 and Member of the Sabah State Legislative Assembly (MLA) for Apas since May 2018. He served as State Assistant Minister of Finance in the GRS state administration under Chief Minister and Minister Hajiji from October 2020 to October 2022. He is a member of the Parti Gagasan Rakyat Sabah (GAGASAN), a component party of the GRS coalition.

Election results

References

Members of the Sabah State Legislative Assembly
Suluk people
Malaysian United Indigenous Party politicians
Living people
Malaysian Muslims
1965 births